Juan Cappiello (born 4 March 1992) is an Argentine rugby union player, currently playing for NOLA Gold of Major League Rugby (MLR). His preferred position is centre.

Professional career
Cappiello signed for Major League Rugby side New Orleans Gold ahead of the 2021 Major League Rugby season.

References

External links
itsrugby.co.uk Profile

1992 births
Living people
Argentine rugby union players
Rugby union centres
US Carcassonne players
Stade Montois players
New Orleans Gold players
Argentina international rugby union players